Events from the 1440s in England.

Incumbents
Monarch – Henry VI

Events
 1440
 7 July – Hundred Years' War: John Talbot, 1st Earl of Shrewsbury recaptures Harfleur from the French.
 12 September – King Henry VI founds Eton College.
 1441
 2 April – King Henry VI founds King's College, Cambridge.
 19 September – Hundred Years' War: French capture Pontoise and Île-de-France.
 1442
 19 January – Eleanor Cobham, wife of Humphrey, Duke of Gloucester, convicted of treason and witchcraft.
 11 June – Hundred Years' War: France invades Gascony.
 1443
 23 April – perpetual truce signed with Burgundy.
 13 May – John Stafford enthroned as Archbishop of Canterbury.
 August – Hundred Years' War: 8,000 strong expeditionary force under John Beaufort, 1st Duke of Somerset lands at Cherbourg.
 1444
 22 May – the Treaty of Tours, signed between England and France, secures a truce in the Hundred Years' War for 5 years and includes an arrangement for Henry VI to marry Margaret of Anjou.
 A serious fire occurs at Old St Paul's Cathedral in London.
 1445
 23 April – Henry VI marries Margaret of Anjou at Titchfield Abbey.
 14 July – Hundred Years' War: negotiations for a peace treaty begin in London.
 1446
 26 June – Hundred Years' War: Henry re-asserts his claim over Brittany.
 25 July – Henry lays the foundation stone of King's College Chapel, Cambridge.
 1447
 18 February – Duke of Gloucester arrested for treason. He dies five days later.
 9 December – Richard Plantagenet, 3rd Duke of York appointed as the King's representative in Ireland.
 1448
 11 March – Hundred Years' War: England cedes Maine to France.
 16 March – Hundred Years' War: peace negotiations break down over the issue of English control over Brittany.
 23 October – Scottish victory over the English at the Battle of Sark.
 Queen Margaret of Anjou founds Queens' College, Cambridge.
 Earliest known reference to Morris dance in England.
 1449
 24 March – Hundred Years' War: English capture Fougères in Brittany.
 May – An English privateering fleet led by Robert Wennington challenges ships of the Hanseatic League.
 July – Hundred Years' War: French invade Normandy.
 29 October – Hundred Years' War: Rouen surrenders to the French.
 Earliest known grant of a patent in England, by Henry VI to John of Utynam for the introduction of coloured glass manufacture.

Births
 1440
approximate Henry Deane, Archbishop of Canterbury (died 1503)
 1442
 28 April – King Edward IV of England (died 1483)
 27 September – John de la Pole, 2nd Duke of Suffolk (died 1491)
 Anthony Woodville, 2nd Earl Rivers (died 1483)
 1443
 17 May – Edmund, Earl of Rutland, brother of Kings Edward IV of England and Richard III of England (died 1460)
 31 May – Lady Margaret Beaufort, mother of Henry VII of England (died 1509)
 John de Vere, 13th Earl of Oxford, Lancastrian leader (died 1513)
 Anne Beauchamp, 15th Countess of Warwick (died 1449)
 1444
John de Mowbray, 4th Duke of Norfolk (died 1476)
 1446
Edmund de Ros, 10th Baron de Ros, politician (died 1508)
 William Grocyn, scholar (died 1519)
 1449
 21 October – George Plantagenet, 1st Duke of Clarence, brother of Edward IV and Richard III (died 1478)

Deaths
 1440
 30 September – Reginald Grey, 3rd Baron Grey de Ruthyn, soldier and politician (born c. 1362)
 13 November – Joan Beaufort, Countess of Westmoreland (born c. 1379)
 1441
 27 October – Margery Jourdemayne, "the witch of Eye", burned at the stake
 1443
 12 April – Henry Chichele, Archbishop of Canterbury, having served since 1414, the longest ever in this office (born c. 1364)
 1444
 27 May – John Beaufort, 1st Duke of Somerset, military leader (born 1404)
 1445
 5 June – Leonel Power, composer (year of birth unknown, between 1370–1385)
 11 June – Henry de Beauchamp, 1st Duke of Warwick (born 1424)
 1447
 23 February – Humphrey, Duke of Gloucester (born 1390)
 11 April – Henry Beaufort, Cardinal, Lord Chancellor (born 1377)
 John Holland, 2nd Duke of Exeter (born 1395)
 1449
 Anne Beauchamp, 15th Countess of Warwick (born 1443)

References